Control Your Touch (stylized as CONTROL Your touch) is the debut studio album by Japanese singer-songwriter Yumi Shizukusa. It was released on 3 December 2003 through Styling Records and Giza Studio.

Singles
After appearing on two compilation albums, Giza Studio Mai-K & Friends Hotrod Beach Party (2002) and Day Track "Lady Mastersoul" (2003), Shizukusa released the debut single, "Don't You Wanna See Me (Oh) Tonight?" on 2 July 2003. Despite only peaking at number 35, the song gained the biggest numbers of radio power rotation in Japan at that time.

Track listing

Charts

Release history

References

2003 debut albums
Japanese-language albums
Giza Studio albums